Arantxa Sánchez Vicario was the defending champion, but lost in the final to Mary Pierce. The score was 6–3, 6–3.

Seeds
The first four seeds receive a bye into the second round.

Draw

Finals

Top half

Bottom half

References

External links
 Official results archive (ITF)
 Official results archive (WTA)

Nichirei International Championships
1995 WTA Tour